Sarka (also Romanized as Sarkā; also known as Sarkā’) is a village in Birun Bashm Rural District, Kelardasht District, Chalus County, Mazandaran Province, Iran. At the 2006 census, its population was 119, in 35 families.

Sarka village mosque is located in the central area of the village at coordinates 36.54842, 51.26394{
  "type": "FeatureCollection",
  "features": [
    {
      "type": "Feature",
      "properties": {},
      "geometry": {
        "type": "Polygon",
        "coordinates": [
          [
            [
              51.264055,
              36.548279
            ],
            [
              51.263795,
              36.548264
            ],
            [
              51.263765,
              36.548574
            ],
            [
              51.264068,
              36.548585
            ],
            [
              51.264055,
              36.548279
            ]
          ]
        ]
      }
    }
  ]
}

Sarka village has the cemetery located in the northern part of the village at coordinates 36.55010, 51.26378

{
  "type": "FeatureCollection",
  "features": [
    {
      "type": "Feature",
      "properties": {},
      "geometry": {
        "type": "Point",
        "coordinates": [
          51.263763,
          36.550084
        ]
      }
    }
  ]
}

References 

Populated places in Chalus County